Daniel Stuart Care (born 2 January 1987) is an English rugby union player who plays for Harlequins in the Premiership as a scrum-half.
He has played for England national team since 2008 and has won 87 caps. He previously played for England in several youth age groups as well as England Sevens and England Saxons.

Early career
Care was born in Leeds, West Yorkshire, England. He first played rugby union at age 6, with his local club in Leeds, West Park Bramhope RUFC (now called West Park Leeds RUFC), although his first love was football. At age 11 he was invited to join the Academy at Sheffield Wednesday Football Club which meant giving up club rugby union although he was able to continue playing the game at Prince Henry's Grammar School in Otley.

He helped Prince Henry's win the Under-13 Yorkshire Cup in 2000 but he missed almost all of the next season recovering from a broken leg sustained in a school game.

The following season he was forced to choose between football and rugby union and he asked Sheffield Wednesday to release him from his Academy contract so that he could concentrate on rugby union, by the end of the season he had been selected for Yorkshire Schools' Under-15's.This was his first taste of representative rugby which included a man-of-the-match performance in the Roses game against Lancashire at Pontefract. In May 2002 he was part of the West Yorkshire team that won the inaugural Under-15 National 10-a-side Festival with the final being played in the Commonwealth Games stadium in Manchester.

Further honours followed next season with selection for Yorkshire and the North of England before making his debut for England Schools' Under-16s against Wales at Neath in April 2003. By now Care had resumed club rugby union with Otley and the season also brought another Yorkshire Cup success at Under-16's with Prince Henry's.

Care's progress led to an invitation to join the Leeds Tykes Academy at the start of the 2003–04 season – a season which ended with Tykes winning the National Under-19 Colts Cup and Care being named as Tykes' Players' Young Player of the Year. At school level Care spent the season playing at fly-half and helped Prince Henry's to success in the Under-18 Yorkshire Cup and a famous victory at Twickenham in the final of the Daily Mail Under-18 Vase where he scored 13 points in an 18–11 win against St Columba's College from St Albans. The season finished with selection for the England Clubs Under-18's squad for the Four Nations Tournament held in Belfast where he played against Ireland, Scotland and Wales. He also received a late call up to the replacements' bench for England Under-19s against Ireland although he was not used.

Leeds Tykes

The following season saw further progress at Leeds Tykes where Care made his first XV debut on the wing as a second-half replacement in a pre-season friendly against Exeter Chiefs. His continued involvement with the England Under-19 squad resulted in selection for Team England in the rugby sevens at the 2004 Commonwealth Youth Games in Bendigo, Australia, his first experience of sevens. England won the silver medal, losing narrowly 26–24 to the hosts, Australia, in the Final. Care scored 7 tries during the tournament making him the top try scorer in the competition.

Having been an unused replacement for Tykes in home and away European Challenge Cup games against Grenoble, Care finally made his competitive debut for the club at fly-half away to VRAC in Valladolid, Spain in the European Challenge Shield just a week after returning from Australia. His involvement lasted just 23 minutes before he suffered a broken leg, by which time he had scored a try and kicked 4 conversions.

Despite Care's injury Tykes came forward with the offer of his first professional contract which he signed in December 2004.

Whilst the injury prevented Care taking part in any of England's Under-19 Six Nations games that season he was selected for the squad which travelled to South Africa for the IRB Under-19 World Championship. Unfortunately a knee injury sustained whilst recovering from the broken leg forced him to return home to undergo surgery without playing any part in the Tournament.

After a summer spent getting fit and completing his A-level studies at Prince Henry's, Care was able to join Tykes on a full-time basis with the opportunity to train alongside All Black scrum-half legend Justin Marshall who signed for the club during the close season. A pre-season injury to Tykes' No.2 scrum-half Mark McMillan gave Care an early opportunity to understudy Marshall and he made his Guinness Premiership debut away at Saracens in September 2005 as a replacement for Marshall late in the game. Over the coming weeks further opportunities arose for first team experience including starting appearances in the Powergen Cup against Sale (which brought his first senior try) and against Newcastle (which brought his first man-of-the-match award).

Youth international career
Danny care played 20 times for the England youth setup scoring 25 points between 2003 and 2007. He also played for England sevens in the 2004 youth commonwealth games in Bendigo Australia.

Sevens career

Early in the 2005–06 season he was named in the core squad for the senior England Sevens team and in February 2006 he made his debut at Wellington in the New Zealand leg of the IRB Sevens series. England lost to France in the quarter final of the Cup but bounced back to beat Argentina in the final of the Plate. The squad moved straight on to Los Angeles where they beat Fiji in the final of the Cup to record England's first ever win in the USA leg of the IRB Sevens.

Care's performances in Wellington and Los Angeles earned him selection for Team England at the Commonwealth Games in Melbourne where he picked up a silver medal after defeat by New Zealand in the final of the competition, England's first ever medal in the Games at Rugby Sevens. This success gave Care a unique double as the only England rugby player to win medals at the Commonwealth Youth Games and the senior Commonwealth Games.

In between Los Angeles and Melbourne Care had belatedly had the opportunity to make his debut for the England Under-19 team – 2 years after his first call up as an unused replacement. He marked the occasion by scoring 2 tries in a 35–5 victory over Scotland at the Twickenham Stoop. Later in the season he travelled to Dubai where he was a member of the England squad which achieved 3rd place in the IRB Under-19 World Championship, England's highest ever position in the tournament. Care started the tournament in his customary position at scrum-half but he was selected to start at fly-half in the crucial 3rd/4th place game against France as first choice fly-half Danny Cipriani had suffered concussion in an earlier game against South Africa. Care scored a try late in the game which was converted to bring the game level at 12–12. England clinched 3rd place by virtue of out-scoring France 2 tries to nil.

Harlequins

At the end of the 2005–06 season Care left Leeds Tykes and signed a 3-year contract with Harlequins. Before joining his new club he was a member of the England squad taking part in the IRB Under-21 World Championship in France, making his debut at that level in the opening game against Fiji which England won 34–8. He won 4 caps during the tournament including a starting appearance in the 5th/6th place game against Ireland. Care scored the first try in England's 32–8 victory which gave them 5th place, their highest ever finishing position in the competition.

At Harlequins Care initially found himself understudying Samoan international Steve So'oialo at scrum-half but after disappointing results early in the season the club recruited the experienced Andy Gomarsall, a member of England's World Cup winning squad in 2003. This pushed Care down the pecking order at Harlequins and restricted his game time although he did get opportunities to start in EDF Energy Cup and European Challenge Cup games before making his first Guinness Premiership start for his new club in a memorable 9–3 home win against Bath in January 2007. Later that month he was named as captain of the England Under-20 team for the forthcoming series of Six Nations games, his first experience of captaincy at any level of the game.

Care's debut as captain saw England gain a comfortable 31–5 victory over Scotland at Bath although he was forced to leave the field early in the second half with a bruised hip. A week later Care had recovered sufficiently from his injury to lead his side to a 30–10 victory over Italy, again at Bath, with Care contributing a drop goal in the second half. However England's Grand Slam ambitions were thwarted in the next game 2 weeks later when they lost narrowly 13–6 against Ireland in Athlone. England finished the championship in 3rd place after losing 32–13 to France at Northampton and drawing 21–21 against Wales at Newport with Care captaining the side in all 5 games.

After completing the Six Nations Championship with the England Under-20 team Care was recalled to the England Sevens squad for the Hong Kong and Adelaide legs of the IRB Sevens Tournament during late March / early April 2007. England were knocked out at the quarter final stage in both tournaments. In Hong Kong they lost to New Zealand and in Adelaide they were beaten by Kenya.

At the end of the season Care was part of the Harlequins squad which won the London Floodlit Sevens title at Rosslyn Park for the first time since 1987 before joining up again with the England Sevens squad for the final legs of the 2006/2007 IRB Sevens series at Twickenham and Murrayfield. At Twickenham England failed to qualify for the quarter finals of the Cup after a disastrous 22–0 defeat at the hands of Wales on Day 1. The highlight for Care was a hat-trick of tries in a 17–14 victory over South Africa. On Day 2 England beat Kenya, France and Portugal to win the Bowl competition.

A week later at Murrayfield England again disappointed on Day 1 by failing to qualify for the quarter finals of the Cup after defeats against Argentina and New Zealand. However, once again the team bounced back strongly on Day 2 to win the Bowl beating Portugal 31–0 in the final. Due to the late withdrawal from the squad of England Sevens captain Simon Amor following the birth of his first child, Care was asked to take on additional responsibility by assuming the main play-maker role within the team. He responded by being the 2nd highest scorer in the tournament with 42 points (4 tries + 11 conversions) including 2 spectacular individual tries in a thrilling 24–19 victory over Australia in the Bowl semi-final which went into extra-time.

Season 2007–08
The start of the 2007–08 season presented Care with a chance of an extended run as starting scrum-half at Harlequins as Andy Gomarsall and Steve So'oialo were away at the Rugby World Cup in France with England and Samoa respectively. A good pre-season led to selection for the opening Guinness Premiership fixture of the season in the London Double Header against London Irish at Twickenham. Care was prominent as Harlequins beat London Irish 35–27 although he was forced to leave the field with an ankle injury midway through the second half and was sidelined for 5 weeks. By the time he had recovered Gomarsall and So'oialo had returned to club action and game time was limited in the Premiership although he did start several games in the Heineken Cup and EDF Energy Cup. However the lack of game time did not prevent his call up for the England Saxons training squad in January 2008, followed a few days later by selection for the England Sevens squad to play in Wellington in the New Zealand leg of the IRB Sevens. In Wellington England again disappointed on Day 1 losing all 3 games, including an embarrassing defeat against the Cook Islands. However, as at Twickenham and Murrayfield in 2007, the team bounced back on Day 2 to win the Bowl, beating Argentina 12–7 in the Final. On his return from Wellington he was called into the England Saxons training squad and selected as a replacement for the game against Italy A in Ragusa, Sicily in February 2008. Care made his Saxons debut in the 2nd half helping the team to a comfortable 38–15 victory.

Care's performances during the early part of 2008 earned him a call-up to the England training squad before the Six Nations games against Scotland and Ireland although he was not included in the final 22 for either game. He was named as the Guinness Premiership Player of the Month for March 2008 and in May he was selected for the England squad for the end of season game against the Barbarians and the summer tour to New Zealand.

At the end of the domestic season Care was shortlisted for the Guinness Premiership Young Player of the Year Award – he finished 3rd behind Ben Foden and the winner, Danny Cipriani.

Care made his England debut as a 2nd half replacement in the "non-cap" game against the Barbarians at Twickenham which England won 17–14. His first cap came 2 weeks later as a 2nd half replacement in the First Test against New Zealand at Eden Park, Auckland which New Zealand won 37–20. A week later came his first start for England in the Second Test at Christchurch which New Zealand won 44–12 with Care scoring his first try for England in the 2nd half.

Season 2008–09

In July 2008 Care was selected in the England Elite Player Squad for the forthcoming season. His excellent early season performances for Harlequins in the Guinness Premiership and the Heineken Cup earned him selection for his third England cap as starting scrum-half for the opening Autumn International against the Pacific Islands at Twickenham. Care played a prominent role in England's 39–13 victory and his performance was sufficient to earn him selection in the starting line-up for the 3 remaining Autumn International against Australia, South Africa and New Zealand – England lost all 3 games.

Care was selected to start in the opening game of the 2009 RBS 6 Nations competition against Italy but a slip on ice after a training session at the team hotel in Surrey caused him to withdraw with damaged ankle ligaments and his place in the team was taken by Harry Ellis. The injury meant that Care also missed the next game against Wales but he recovered sufficiently to take a place on the bench against Ireland at Croke Park, Dublin. He came onto the field with 20 minutes of the game remaining with England losing 11–6 but within 10 minutes he had been sent to the sin-bin and England eventually lost narrowly, 14–13. Care was heavily criticised in the national press for his performance in Dublin but England Team Manager, Martin Johnson, resisted calls for him to be dropped from the squad as part of wider criticism of the lack of discipline on the field by the England squad. Care retained his place on the bench for the final RBS 6 Nations games at home to France and Scotland, games that resulted in 2 victories which gave England the runners-up position in the championship. Care replaced Ellis in both games and in the final game against Scotland he was on the field as early as the 16th minute following a head injury to Ellis. Care contributed a drop goal as England beat Scotland 26–12 to regain the Calcutta Cup.

Care had a successful season at club level in 2008–09 with Harlequins who finished 2nd in the Guinness Premiership and reached the quarter-finals of the Heineken Cup, at that point the club's best season in the professional era. Care was considered by many to be unlucky not to be selected for the British and Irish Lions squad for the summer tour to South Africa but he retained his place in the England squad for the end of season game against the Barbarians and the 2 match series against Argentina. Care started all 3 games which began with a 33–26 defeat in the "non-cap" game against an experienced Barbarians team at Twickenham. A week later England beat Argentina 37–15 at Old Trafford, Manchester but lost the return fixture 24–22 the following week in Salta, Argentina meaning that the 2 game series was drawn.

At the end of the domestic season Care was shortlisted for the PRA Young Player of the Year Award which was voted for by his fellow professionals – he finished 3rd in the voting behind Tom Croft and the winner, Ben Foden.

In July 2009 Care was named in the England Elite Player Squad for the forthcoming season. Earlier in the year he had agreed a 2-year contract extension with Harlequins, committing himself to the club until June 2011.

Season 2009–10

Care retained his position as starting scrum-half for the first of the Autumn Internationals in 2009 against Australia, England lost the game 18–9. There was widespread criticism of the overall team performance and there were 4 changes for the game the following week against Argentina with Care moving to the replacements' bench to be replaced by Paul Hodgson. In another disappointing game England beat Argentina 16–9 and Care remained on the bench for the final game against New Zealand which England lost 19–6. Care made brief appearances late in the game against both Argentina and New Zealand.

By the start of the 2010 RBS 6 Nations Care had regained his place as No.1 scrum-half and he started all 5 games in the championship. He played a prominent part in England's 30–17 victory against Wales in the opening game at Twickenham, scoring a try early in the second half and the following week against Italy in Rome, England won 17–12. England selected an unchanged team for the next game at home to Ireland but lost 20–16 to a late Irish try. England's championship hopes ended in the next game, away to Scotland, which finished 15-all. Care was part of a much improved England performance in the final game of the championship against France in Paris. France won 12–10 to claim the Grand Slam, England finished in 3rd place.

At club level Care had a disappointing season with Harlequins who finished in 8th place in the Guinness Premiership, missing out on qualification for the Heineken Cup.

At the end of the season Care was part of the England squad which travelled to Australia and New Zealand for a 5-game tour including 2 Tests against Australia but before the tour party left England played against the Barbarians at Twickenham in a "non-cap" game. Care started the game which England won 35–26.

In Australia Care started the 1st Test against Australia in Perth which Australia won 27–17. England's poor performance in the game attracted significant criticism and Care was replaced by Ben Youngs for the 2nd Test one week later in Sydney. England narrowly won the 2nd Test 21–20 to tie the Test series 1 game all with Care coming off the bench after 66 minutes with England just 1 point ahead to help guide the team to a famous victory, only the 3rd time England had beaten Australia in Australia.

After the Australian leg of the tour England moved on to New Zealand to play against New Zealand Maori in Napier in a "non-cap" game as part of the centenary celebrations for Maori rugby. Care started the game and scored a try late in the 1st half to help England to a 28–17 lead at half-time but England failed to capitalise on that lead and lost the game 35–28.

In July 2010 Care was named in the England Elite Player Squad for the forthcoming season. At the same time, in the July edition of Company magazine Care was nominated at 11th in the list of "the 50 sexiest single men in the UK". In August 2010 Care agreed a 2-year contract extension with Harlequins, committing himself to the club until June 2013. In October 2010, Care visited Wallington County Grammar School to attend the Sports Hall opening.

Season 2010–11

During the Autumn internationals in November 2010 Care found himself on the replacements bench for all 4 games with Ben Youngs taking the starting position. England lost the opening game to New Zealand 26–16 before wins against Australia by 35–18 and against Samoa 26–13. The final game of the series against South Africa saw England lose 21–11. Care made second-half appearances in all 4 games and the South Africa game saw him reach the landmark of 25 caps at the age of just 23. He made significant contributions in all 4 games including an "assist" for a late try by Tom Croft which clinched the victory against Samoa. Care's club Director of Rugby at Harlequins, Conor O'Shea, commented "When Danny came off the bench in the Autumn Internationals he was outstanding. Hopefully he will keep getting better and better". In January 2011 Care was named in the revised England Elite Player Squad for the 2011 RBS 6 Nations series.

Care was again on the England bench throughout the 2011 RBS 6 Nations with Ben Youngs starting at scrum-half alongside Toby Flood at fly-half in all 5 games. In the opening game against Wales in Cardiff, Care and Jonny Wilkinson were brought on in the 2nd half to replace Youngs and Flood to close out a narrow 26–19 victory. A week later at Twickenham against Italy, Care and Wilkinson were again brought on midway through the 2nd half to replace Youngs and Flood but this time in different circumstances as England won comfortably 59–13 with Care scoring one of England's eight tries on the day shortly after coming onto the pitch. In Round 3 of the championship England beat France 17–9 at Twickenham with Care and Wilkinson coming on in the 2nd half to help steer England to victory. In Round 4 against Scotland at Twickenham Care and Wilkinson again replaced Youngs and Flood in the 2nd half to help protect a narrow lead with England eventually winning 22–16. A week later England travelled to Dublin to play Ireland in Round 5 knowing that a win would give them the Championship and a Grand Slam. Care was again on the bench but was on the pitch as early as the 46th minute to replace Ben Youngs who had earlier been sin-binned. England were well beaten 24–8 but won the 2011 RBS 6 Nations Championship as nearest rivals Wales were beaten by France in Paris.

Care had a successful season at club level with Harlequins, picking up a winners medal as the club won the Amlin Challenge Cup, the 2nd tier European club rugby competition. Care made 7 appearances during the Cup run contributing 3 tries + 1 conversion. Having come top of their Pool which consisted of Bayonne (France), Connacht (Ireland) and I Cavalieri Prato (Italy), Harlequins beat Wasps (England) at home in the quarter-final and Munster (Ireland) away in the semi-final to qualify for a place in the final at the Cardiff City Stadium against Stade Francais (France). The semi-final victory over Munster was memorable as it was only the 2nd home defeat for the Irish province in 16 years of European competitions. Care scored important tries against Wasps and Munster and with Harlequins losing 18–12 in the final with only 5 minutes to play he produced a line break and chip kick to enable Gonzalo Camacho to score a vital try out wide which was converted by Nick Evans to give Harlequins a narrow win, 19–18. The win was crucial to enable Harlequins to qualify for the 1st tier European club rugby competition, the Heineken Cup, for the 2011–12 season as the club had failed to qualify via the Aviva Premiership by finishing 7th, just outside the top 6 places which automatically qualified. Care scored 7 tries in all competitions during the season and was named in the ESPN Dream Team for 2010–11.

In June 2011 Care was named in England's preliminary 45-man training squad prior to the Rugby World Cup. At the same time, in the July edition of Company magazine Care was nominated at 27th in the list of "the 50 sexiest single men in the UK".

England's home-and-away Rugby World Cup "warm up" games against Wales in August gave Care the chance to press his claims for a place in the final 30-man squad to travel to New Zealand as well as an opportunity to re-claim the starting jersey in the absence of Ben Youngs who was recovering from knee surgery. In the opening game at Twickenham Care was partnered by Jonny Wilkinson at fly-half as England won 23–19. Paul Ackford of the Sunday Telegraph said Care was "part of a fine half-back pairing". Care received widespread praise, especially in Wales, for his sportsmanship during the game in refusing to play the ball at the base of a ruck when it was clear that Welsh full-back Morgan Stoddart was badly injured following a tackle. Referee Steve Walsh was forced to stop the game to allow Stoddart to be treated for what turned out to be a double fracture of tibia and fibula. For the return game in Cardiff a week later Wilkinson was rested in favour of Toby Flood and Care was on the replacements' bench with Richard Wigglesworth starting. Care was on the field as early as the 29th minute when Wigglesworth suffered a head injury. England lost 19–9 but Stephen Jones of the Sunday Times, a longtime critic of Care, said "Danny Care made a significant impact and was probably England's best player". Unfortunately Care sustained a torn plantar plate affecting the big toe of his left foot during the game, an injury which required surgery and which kept him out of England's squad for the World Cup. The medical reports confirming that surgery was required came just a few hours after Care had been informed by England Head Coach Martin Johnson that he would be included in the squad.

Whilst recovering from his injury Care worked for ESPN and Sky Sports on rugby coverage as well as being an analyst for ITV's coverage of the 2011 Rugby World Cup.

Season 2011-12
Care was arrested on 10 December 2011 on suspicion of being drunk and disorderly. He was not charged but was subsequently fined by Harlequins. He was also arrested and charged with drink driving on 1 January 2012. He was again disciplined by Harlequins and was told that he would not be considered for selection for the England Six Nations squad. On 16 January 2012 Care attended Southampton Magistrates' Court where he pleaded guilty to a charge of drink driving. He was banned from driving for 16 months and fined £3,100. Care was arrested outside the Queens Hotel in the early hours of 4 March 2012 in Leeds. He was taken to a station by officers and questioned about the offence before being released. Care was given a caution for being drunk and disorderly.

On 23 March 2012 Care was accused of sexual assault earlier in the month. He was bailed pending further enquiries. On 9 July 2012 Care was advised that the police investigation had been completed. The Crown Prosecution Service had decided that there was no case to answer. 

Despite his off-field issues Care helped Harlequins to their best ever season as they became English champions for the first time in the club's history. Harlequins finished top of the Aviva Premiership at the end of the regular season and qualified for a home semi-final in the play-offs against Northampton Saints. Care missed the semi-final due to a shoulder injury but Harlequins beat Northampton 25–23 to quality for the final against Leicester Tigers. Care had recovered from injury in time to play a prominent part in the play-off final at Twickenham as Harlequins beat Leicester 30–23. Stephen Jones of the Sunday Times said "Danny Care at scrum-half had what may well have been the game of his career. He was marvellously sharp and his decision-making was immaculate". Care made 16 appearances during the Premiership season and contributed 4 tries + 1 drop goal.

Despite winning 5 out of 6 group games in the Heineken Cup, Harlequins failed to qualify for the quarter-finals and dropped down to the Amlin Challenge Cup which gave them the opportunity to defend the trophy they had won the previous season. Harlequins lost 37–8 away to RC Toulon (France) in the Amlin Challenge Cup quarter-final, Care scored Harlequins only try late in the game. Care's excellent end of season form earned him a recall to the England senior squad for the summer tour to South Africa. Care was overlooked for the first Test against South Africa in Durban with Ben Youngs starting and Lee Dickson on the bench, England lost 22–17. However, Care started the first mid-week game of the tour in the "non-cap" game against South African Barbarians South in Kimberley. England won 54–26 with Care scoring one of England's 8 tries late in the second-half. Care was again overlooked in favour of Youngs & Dickson for the second Test in Johannesburg, England lost 36–27. Youngs injured his shoulder in Johannesburg, an injury which caused him to return home for surgery. This opened the way for Care to be recalled to the starting XV for the third and final Test in Port Elizabeth with Dickson on the bench. A much improved performance saw England draw 14–14 which meant South Africa won the series 2–0 with 1 game drawn. Care scored England's only try early in the first half and was named man of the match.

In July 2012 Care was named in the England Elite Player Squad for the forthcoming season. In August 2012 Care agreed a 3-year contract extension with Harlequins, committing himself to the club until June 2016.

Season 2012–13
Care's man of the match performance against South Africa in the final match of the summer tour meant that he retained the starting shirt for the opening game of the Autumn Internationals against Fiji. England won comfortably 54–12 despite Care being sin-binned midway through the first half for a tip-tackle on Leone Nakarawa. Care started the game the following week against Australia but England produced a disappointing performance and lost 20–14. There were 6 changes for the next game against South Africa with Care moving to the bench and Ben Youngs taking the starting shirt, England lost narrowly 16–15. Care remained on the bench for the final game of the series against reigning world champions New Zealand. England beat New Zealand 38–21, their first win over the All Blacks in 9 years and only their seventh victory in the history of the fixture. Care made significant contributions off the bench in the second half of both the South Africa & New Zealand games.

Ben Youngs retained the starting shirt for the opening game of the 2013 RBS 6 Nations championship against Scotland at Twickenham. England won 38–18 with Care coming off the bench in the second half to score England's fourth try in the final minute of the game. Care remained on the bench for the Round 2 fixture against Ireland in Dublin the following week. England won a tight game 12–6 and Care did not get onto the field, the first time in his England career that he had been an unused replacement. In Round 3, 2 weeks later, Care came off the bench in the second half to guide England to a narrow 23–13 victory against France at Twickenham. Care was given the opportunity to start in the Round 4 game against Italy at Twickenham but despite winning 18–11 the England performance was disappointing. Care was back on the bench for the championship decider against Wales in Cardiff in the final game of the tournament. England had the opportunity to clinch the championship and a Grand Slam but Wales won comfortably 30–3, England's biggest ever defeat in the fixture, and they had to settle for the runners-up position.

In March 2013 Care featured as a "Mystery Guest" in BBC TV's "A Question of Sport".

At club level Care helped Harlequins to finish 3rd in the Aviva Premiership and qualify for the end of season play-offs. In the semi-final away to Leicester Tigers they lost 33–16 to end the defence of their title. Care scored 8 tries in 17 Premiership appearances during the season – the best tally of his career in a single season. In the penultimate game of the regular season away at Worcester Warriors Care reached the milestone of 100 Premiership appearances (6 for Leeds Tykes + 94 for Harlequins) – he celebrated by scoring 2 tries as Harlequins beat Worcester 42–26 to clinch their semi-final place.

Harlequins qualified for the quarter-finals of the Heineken Cup by winning all 6 of their group games against Biarritz (France); Connacht (Ireland) & Zebre (Italy). Harlequins were top seeds from the qualification stages and earned a home quarter-final against Munster (Ireland) but lost the match 18–12. Care scored 4 tries in 7 appearances in the competition.

Care was one of six players shortlisted for the Aviva Premiership Rugby Player of the Year Award, the winner was Tom Youngs (Leicester Tigers). He was also shortlisted for the Rugby Players' Association (RPA) Player of the Year Award, the winner was Christian Wade (London Wasps).

At Harlequins Care was named as the Supporters' Player of the Season and also the winner of the Try of the Season Award for his try in the home game against Leicester Tigers in February 2013.

Care failed to be selected for the 2013 British and Irish Lions squad to tour Australia. Greg Growden, writing for ESPN Scrum.com in Australia, said, "Danny Care's chances of making the tour were always going to be hard after spending most of the Six Nations series on the England bench, acting as Ben Youngs' back-up."

In August 2013 Care was named in the England Elite Player Squad for the forthcoming season.

Season 2020–21
Care won his second Premiership title and started as Harlequins won the game 40-38 in the highest scoring Premiership final ever on 26 June 2021.

International stats

International tries

International drop goals

Honours

England

− RBS Six Nations Winners 2011; 2016 (Grand Slam); 2017

- RBS Six Nations Runners-up 2009; 2013; 2014 (Triple Crown)

Harlequins
 Premiership: 2011–12, 2020–21
 EPCR Challenge Cup: 2010–11
 EPCR Challenge Cup runner up: 2015–16

Team England Sevens

− Commonwealth Youth Games 2004 Silver medal

− Commonwealth Games 2006 Silver medal

References

External links
 
 
 
 
 

1987 births
Living people
English people of Irish descent
Commonwealth Games medallists in rugby sevens
Commonwealth Games rugby sevens players of England
Commonwealth Games silver medallists for England
England international rugby sevens players
England international rugby union players
English rugby union players
Harlequin F.C. players
Leeds Tykes players
Male rugby sevens players
Otley R.U.F.C. players
People educated at Prince Henry's Grammar School, Otley
Rugby sevens players at the 2006 Commonwealth Games
Rugby union players from Leeds
Rugby union scrum-halves
Medallists at the 2006 Commonwealth Games